Sean Kilgannon (born 8 March 1981) is a Scottish former footballer, who played for several clubs. He started his career at Premier League side Middlesbrough, where he made one appearance as a substitute against Newcastle United.

References

External links

1981 births
Living people
Scottish footballers
Middlesbrough F.C. players
Ross County F.C. players
Dunfermline Athletic F.C. players
Partick Thistle F.C. players
Raith Rovers F.C. players
Forfar Athletic F.C. players
Footballers from Stirling
Premier League players
Scottish Premier League players
Scottish Football League players
Scottish Junior Football Association players
Association football midfielders
Camelon Juniors F.C. players